Chung Sang-nam (born 1969) is a South Korean football manager and former footballer. He played for the Pohang Steelers, and represented South Korea at the 1996 Summer Olympics.

In 2015, he was appointed as manager of FC Seoul U-15 team

References

External links 
 
 

South Korean footballers
K League 1 players
Pohang Steelers players
Suwon Samsung Bluewings players
FC Seoul non-playing staff
Yonsei University alumni
1975 births
Living people
Footballers at the 1996 Summer Olympics
Olympic footballers of South Korea
Association football forwards